The third season of Next Top Model by Cătălin Botezatu premiered on September 20, 2012.

The judging panel for season three remained unchanged.

Sixteen contestants were chosen again for this year's competition. The winner of the competition was 22-year-old Ramona Popescu from Bucharest.

The international destinations for this season were Mykonos, Paphos, and Cappadocia.

Cast

Contestants

(Ages stated are at start of contest)

Judges
Cătălin Botezatu
Laurent Tourette
Liviu Ionescu
Mirela Vescan

Episodes

Episode 1
First aired September 20, 2012

Casting week. The final sixteen contestants are selected by Cătălin to join the competition, but Veronica decides to leave the show to remain in school. The following day, Bianca enters the competition.

First call-out: Victoria Cartiră
Quit: Veronica Cazac
Special guests: Alina Pușcaș, Guido Dolci

Episode 2
First aired September 27, 2012

The models receive their makeovers. Later, the girls receive a regulation of top model. The next day the girls take part in the first challenge.

At the winner of the first challenge is Andreea. The first photo shoot in this season took place in nature, with Mihai Ștețcu photographing the girls. The theme for the shoot was forbidden fruit. The girls posed with a male model. During the first photo shoot, Silvana was eliminated because of her poor performance, but in the end she got another chance.

At panel Denisa, Ramona, Barbara and Bianca had the best photos. Silvana's photo received heavy criticism, as did Sânziana's and Laura's. Sânziana and Silvana found themselves in the bottom two for their poor photos. Cătălin handed the last photograph to Sânziana, resulting in Silvana's elimination.

First Call-out: Denisa Ciocoiu
Bottom Two: Sânziana Cozorici & Silvana Anghel
Eliminated: Silvana Anghel
Featured photographer: Mihai Ștețcu

Episode 3
First aired October 4, 2012

At the runway challenge, the girls walk in a fashion show wearing dresses designed by Mihai Albu and Cătălin Botezatu. In the next day the girls walk again with a male model in a fashion show by Cătălin, but Cătălin decided that Sânziana, Victoria and Diana Luca did not participate in this catwalk. Cătălin and the girls did made Sânziana's surprise for to cheer up.

At the photo shoot, the girls do a shoot inspired of Greek Mythology Part II, due to health problems, Laura did not participate on the photo shoot.

At judging, Otilia, Cristina, Lavinia, Sânziana and Denisa received praise from the judges while Barbara, Diana Luca, Victoria and Bianca had the worst photos. Victoria becomes faint at panel due emotions. Bianca landed in the bottom two for slowly sliding down the competition with Diana Luca and in a shocking elimination, both of them were sent home.

First Call-out: Otilia Cioșă
Bottom Two: Bianca Taban & Diana Luca 
Eliminated: Bianca Taban & Diana Luca 
Featured photographer:  Andreea Retinschi

Episode 4
First aired October 11, 2012

In this episode, in first challenge the girls made a catwalk blindfolded and holding objects in hands, the end no girl don't won the challenge. In next day the girls walk in a salt mine at low temperatures, in this catwalk Ramona was criticized for poor performance. After catwalk Barbara said about as Ramona is lesbian and Ramona denied. Begin the photoshoot Lavinia and Ramona have laughed at Sânziana.

At the photo shoot, the girls have posed in a site with a male models, Ramona, Laura and Victoria got praised while Lavina was criticized because she gaining weight. After the photoshoot Ruxandra cried because poor performance in this day.

At panel, Victoria was praised for her photo and her performance during the challenge, ultimately receiving the first call-out. The special guest, Mircea Bărbulescu has appreciated Laura's photography. Andreea and Lavinia were placed in the bottom two. In the end, Lavinia was saved and Andreea was eliminated. After Andreea's elimination the two twins Laura and Cristina had said as Sânziana must eliminated not Andreea because Sânziana had the worst photos.

First Call-out: Victoria Cartiră
Bottom Two: Andreea Grecu & Lavinia Furtună
Eliminated: Andreea Grecu
Featured photographer:  Marta Popescu
Special guests:  Mircea Bărbulescu

Episode 5
First aired October 18, 2012

The models were subject to a number of acting. At photoshoot the girls were posed with a male models, the theme was (Angels and Damons). After the photoshoot the girls have had a gymnastics lesson while Lavinia was very criticized, Victoria was the best and she was appreciate. At home Sânziana told them girls about her life in the orphanage. Most girls said they Sânziana is privileged because she lived in the orphanage.
At challenge the girls were decorations for boys (table, chair, hanger, etc.) for this challenge the girls were divided in two teams. Team one is Cristina's team and team two is Laura's team. The winning team is Cristina's team.

At panel, the two twins Laura and Cristina were praised. Because Cristina, Lavinia, Victoria, Barbara, Sânziana and Diana Z. were immune from elimination after their team won the reward challenge. Alexandra and Ruxandra landed in the bottom two for their poor performance, but in the end, Alexandra was spared and Ruxandra was eliminated.

First Call-out: Barbara Langellotti
Bottom Two: Alexandra Urs & Ruxandra Postatny
Eliminated: Ruxandra Postatny
Featured photographer: Zsoltan

Episode 6
First aired October 25, 2012

At the photo shoot, Mihai Ștețcu teach the girls on posing while being tossed in the air, Otilia, Sânziana and Victoria got praised while Lavinia, Alexandra and Ramona struggled. After the photoshoot girls made a party. During the party Lavinia stole Otilia's phone and gave to Cătălin. After party Otilia went in the Lavinia's room and they quarreled.

At the runway challenge, the girls walk on the stone catwalk. Victoria was the most criticized because fell many times. After the runway challenge Lavinia was on the verge of being disqualified because she took Ramona's phone from Cătălin.

At the photo shoot, the girls have posed in Mykonos, Greece. Ramona posed with a pelican. Sânziana Victoria and Alexandra were the most criticized.

At the panel, Otilia, Denisa and the two twins Laura and Cristina receive praise, while Alexandra, Sânziana, Lavinia and Victoria do not. Alexandra, Lavinia, Victoria and Sânziana are called forward as the bottom four, all of whom were not liked by the judges. Nevertheless, Cătălin hands the girls a single sheet with all four of their photographs and decides to not send any of them home.

First Call-out: Cristina Iordache
Bottom Four:  Alexandra Urs, Lavinia Furtună, Sânziana Cozorici & Victoria Cartiră
Eliminated: None
Featured photographer: Mihai Ștețcu

Episode 7
First aired November 1, 2012

First Call-out: Otilia Cioșă
Bottom Two:  Laura Iordache & Victoria Cartiră
Eliminated: Victoria Cartiră
Featured photographer: Mihai Ștețcu

Episode 8
First aired November 8, 2012

First Call-out: Barbara Langellotti
Bottom Three:  Alexandra Urs, Diana Zamfir & Ramona Popescu
Eliminated: Alexandra Urs & Diana Zamfir
Featured photographer: Mihai Ștețcu

Episode 9
First aired November 15, 2012

First Call-out: Otilia Cioșă
Bottom Two:  Denisa Ciocoiu & Sânziana Cozorici
Eliminated: Sânziana Cozorici
Featured photographer: Oana Mihoc

Episode 10
First aired November 22, 2012

First Call-out: Barbara Langellotti
Bottom Two: Cristina Iordache & Otilia Cioșă  
Eliminated: None
Featured photographer: N/A

Episode 11
First aired December 6, 2012

First Call-out: Ramona Popescu 
Bottom Two: Denisa Ciocoiu & Otilia Cioșă
Eliminated: Otilia Cioșă
Featured photographer: N/A

Episode 12
First aired December 13, 2012

First Call-out: Denisa Ciocoiu
Bottom Two: Laura Iordache & Lavinia Furtună
Eliminated: Lavinia Furtună 
Featured photographer: N/A

Episode 13
First aired December 20, 2012

First Call-out: Ramona Popescu 
Bottom Three:  Barbara Langellotti, Cristina Iordache & Laura Iordache
Eliminated: Cristina Iordache & Laura Iordache 
Featured photographer: N/A

Episode 14
First aired December 27, 2012

Final Three: Barbara Langellotti, Denisa Ciocoiu & Ramona Popescu
Romania's Next Top Model: Ramona Popescu
Featured photographers: N/A

Summaries

Call-Out order

 The contestant quit the competition.
 The contestant was eliminated.
 The contestant was immune from elimination.
 The contestant was part of a non-elimination.
 The contestant won the competition.

 In episode 1, Veronica withdrew from the competition. She was replaced by Bianca later that episode.
 In episode 3, Laura did not participate in the photo-shoot. Bianca and Diana L, were both eliminated when they landed in the bottom two.
 In episode 5, Barbara, Cristina, Diana Z, Lavinia, Sânziana, and Victoria were immune from elimination after their team won the reward challenge.
 In episode 6, Alexandra, Lavinia, Sânziana, and Victoria landed in the bottom four. None of them were eliminated.
 In episode 8, Alexandra, Diana Z, and Ramona landed in the bottom three. Cătălin handed the last photograph to Ramona, eliminating Alexandra and Diana. 
 In episode 10, Cristina and Otilia landed in the bottom two. Cătălin revealed that neither of them was eliminated.
In episode 13, Barbara, Cristina, and Laura landed in the bottom three. Cătălin handed the last photograph to Barbara, eliminating Cristina and Laura.

Photo shoots
Episode 2 Photo Shoot: Adam and Eve with a Python 
Episode 3 Photo Shoot: Posing Nude Behind a Wall of Ice
Episode 4 Photo Shoot: Construction Workers
Episode 5 Photo Shoot: Angels and Demons on Motorcycles
Episode 6 Photo Shoot: Wearing Black Gowns in Mykonos
Episode 7 Photo Shoot: Mermaids on the Beach
Episode 8 Photo Shoot: Greek Marble Statues 
Episode 9 Photo Shoot: Cruella de Vil inspired editorial 
Episode 10 Photo Shoot: Aphrodite near a Waterfall
Episode 11 Photo Shoot:  Pin-up Girls
Episode 12 Photo Shoot: Golfers with a Male Model
Episode 13 Photo Shoot: Snow White with a pair of Dwarfs
Episode 14 Photo Shoots: The Lord of the Rings; Model Fairy Tales

References

External links
 Official website

Romania
Romanian television series
Antena 1 (Romania) original programming